The Grand Canal, known to the Chinese as the Jing–Hang Grand Canal (or more commonly, as the「大运河」("Grand Canal")), a UNESCO World Heritage Site, is the longest canal or artificial river in the world. Starting in Beijing, it passes through Tianjin and the provinces of Hebei, Shandong, Jiangsu, and Zhejiang to the city of Hangzhou, linking the Yellow River and Yangtze River. The oldest parts of the canal date back to the 5th century BC, but the various sections were first connected during the Sui dynasty (581–618 AD). Dynasties in 1271–1633 significantly restored and rebuilt the canal and altered its route to supply their capital. The Grand Canal played a major role in reunifying north and south China. The canal was built by conscripted laborers and connected the Yellow River in the north with the Yangtze River in the south, which made it much easier to transport grain from the south to the centers of political and military power in north China.

Its greatest height is reached in the mountains of Shandong, at a summit of 42 m (138 ft). Ships in Chinese canals did not have trouble reaching higher elevations after the pound lock was invented in the 10th century, during the Song dynasty (960–1279), by the government official and engineer Qiao Weiyue. The canal has been admired by many throughout history including Japanese monk Ennin (794–864), Persian historian Rashid al-Din (1247–1318), Korean official Choe Bu (1454–1504), and Italian missionary Matteo Ricci (1552–1610).

Historically, periodic flooding of the Yellow River threatened the safety and functioning of the canal. During wartime, the high dikes of the Yellow River were sometimes deliberately broken in order to flood and thus sweep away advancing enemy troops. This would cause disaster and prolonged economic hardships for local residents. Despite temporary periods of desolation and disuse, the Grand Canal furthered an indigenous and growing economic market in China's urban centers from the Sui period onwards to the present. It has allowed faster trading and has thus improved China's economy. The portion south of the Yellow River remains in heavy use by barges carrying bulk materials and containers.

History

Early periods
In the late Spring and Autumn period, Fuchai, King of the State of Wu (whose capital was in present-day Suzhou), ventured north to attack the State of Qi. He ordered a canal to be constructed for trading purposes, as well as a means to ship ample supplies north in case his forces should engage the northern states of Song and Lu. This became known as the Han or Hangou Canal   Hángōu). Work began in 486 BCE, from south of Yangzhou to north of Huai'an in Jiangsu, and within three years the Han Canal had connected the Yangtze with the Huai River utilizing existing waterways, lakes, and marshes.

The Han Canal is known as the second oldest section of the later Grand Canal since the Hong Canal (t s Hónggōu, "Canal of the Wild Geese" or "Far-Flung Canal") most likely preceded it. It linked the Yellow River near Kaifeng to the Si and Bian rivers and became the model for the shape of the Grand Canal in the north. The exact date of the Hong Canal's construction is uncertain; it is first mentioned by the diplomat Su Qin in 330 BCE when discussing state boundaries. The historian Sima Qian (145–90 BCE) knew of no historical date for it, placing his discussion of it just after the legendary works of Yu the Great; modern scholars now consider it to belong to the 6th century BCE.

The Sui dynasty

The sections of the Grand Canal today in Zhejiang and southern Jiangsu provinces were in large part a creation of the Sui dynasty (581–618), a result of the migration of China's core economic and agricultural region away from the Yellow River valley in the north and toward the southern provinces. Its main role throughout its history was the transport of grain to the capital. The institution of the Grand Canal by the Qin dynasty and the Sui dynasty, mostly the Sui, also obviated the need for the army to become self-sufficient farmers while posted at the northern frontier, as food supplies could now easily be shipped from south to north over the pass.

By the year 600, there were major buildups of silt on the bottom of the Hong Canal, obstructing river barges whose drafts were too deep for its waters. The chief engineer of the Sui dynasty, Yuwen Kai, advised the dredging of a new canal that would run parallel to the existing canal, diverging from it at Chenliu (Yanzhou). The new canal was to pass not Xuzhou but Suzhou, to avoid connecting with the Si River, and instead make a direct connection with the Huai River just west of Lake Hongze. With the recorded labor of five million people under the supervision of Ma Shumou, the first major section of the Grand Canal was completed in the year 605—called the Bian Qu. The Grand Canal was fully completed under the second Sui emperor, from the years 604 to 609, first by linking Luoyang to the Yangzhou (and the Yangtze valley), then expanding it to Hangzhou (south), and Beijing (north). This allowed the southern area to provide grain to the northern province, particularly to troops stationed there. Running alongside and parallel to the canal was an imperial roadway and post offices supporting a courier system. The government also planted an enormous line of trees. The history of the canal's construction is handed down in the book Kaiheji ('Record of the Opening of the Canal').

The earlier dike-building project in 587 along the Yellow River—overseen by engineer Liang Rui—established canal lock gates to regulate water levels for the canal. Double slipways were installed to haul boats over when the difference in water levels were too great for the flash lock to operate.

Between 604 and 609, Emperor Yang of the Sui dynasty ordered several canals to be dug in a 'Y' shape, from Hangzhou in the south to terminate in (modern) Beijing and the capital region along the Yellow River valley. When the canal was completed it linked the systems of the Qiantang River, the Yangtze River, the Huai River, the Yellow River, the Wei River, and the Hai River. Its southern section, running between Hangzhou and the Yangtze, was named the Jiangnan River (the river ‘South of the Yangtze’). The canal's central portions stretched from Yangzhou to Luoyang; the section between the Yangtze and the Huai continued to the Shanyang River, and the next section connected the Huai to the Yellow River and was called the Tongji Channel. The northernmost portion, linking Beijing and Luoyang, was named the Yongji Channel. This portion of the canal was used to transport troops to what is now the North Korean border region during the Goguryeo-Sui Wars (598–614).

The Grand Canal at this time was not a continuous, man-made canal, but a collection of often noncontiguous artificial channels and either canalized or natural rivers.

Tang to Yuan dynasties
Although the Tang dynasty (618–907) capital at Chang'an was the most thriving metropolis of China in its day, it was the city of Yangzhou—in proximity to the Grand Canal—that was the economic hub of the Tang era. Besides being the headquarters for the government salt monopoly and the largest pre-modern industrial production center of the empire, Yangzhou was also the geographical midpoint along the north–south trade axis, and so became the major center for southern goods shipped north. One of the greatest benefits of the canal system in the Tang dynasty—and subsequent dynasties—was that it reduced the cost of shipping grain that had been collected in taxes (caoyun) from the Yangtze River Delta to northern China. Minor additions to the canal were made after the Sui period to cut down on travel time, but overall no fundamental differences existed between the Sui Grand Canal and the Tang Grand Canal.

The Tang government oversaw canal lock efficiency and built granaries along the route in case a flood or other disaster impeded the path of shipment. To ensure smooth travel of grain shipments, Transport Commissioner Liu Yan (in office from 763 to 779) had special river barge ships designed and constructed to fit the depths of each section of the entire canal.

After the An Shi Rebellion (755–763), the economy of northern China was greatly damaged and never recovered due to wars and to constant flooding of the Yellow River. Such a case occurred in the year 858 when an enormous flood along the Grand Canal inundated thousands of acres of farmland and killed tens of thousands of people in the North China Plain. Such an unfortunate event could reduce the legitimacy of a ruling dynasty by causing others to perceive it as having lost the Mandate of Heaven; this was a good reason for dynastic authorities to maintain a smooth and efficient canal system.

The city of Kaifeng grew to be a major hub, later becoming the capital of the Song dynasty (960–1279). Although the Tang and Song dynasty international seaports—the greatest being Guangzhou and Quanzhou, respectively—and maritime foreign trade brought merchants great fortune, it was the Grand Canal within China that spurred the greatest amount of economic activity and commercial profit. During the Song and earlier periods, barge ships occasionally crashed and wrecked along the Shanyang Yundao section of the Grand Canal while passing the double slipways, and more often than not those were then robbed of the tax grain by local bandits. This prompted Qiao Weiyue, an Assistant Commissioner of Transport for Huainan, to invent a double-gate system known as the pound lock in the year 984. This allowed ships to wait within a gated space while the water could be drained to appropriate levels; the Chinese also built roofed hangars over the space to add further protection for the ships.

Much of the Grand Canal was ruined for several years after 1128 when Kaifeng's governor Du Chong  Dù Chōng, d.1141) decided to break the dykes and dams holding back the waters of the Yellow River in order to decimate the oncoming Jurchen invaders during the Jin–Song wars. Over a series of floods, this entirely shifted the river south of Shandong, capturing the course of the Si River and emptying the Yellow River into Hongze Lake and the East China Sea for centuries. The Jurchen Jin dynasty continually battled with the Song in this region. The warfare led to the dilapidation of the canal until the Mongols invaded in the 13th century and began necessary repairs.

During the Mongol Yuan dynasty (1271–1368) the capital of China was moved to Beijing, eliminating the need for the canal arm flowing west to Kaifeng or Luoyang. As in the Song and Jin era, the canal fell into disuse and dilapidation during the Yuan dynasty's decline.

The Grand Canal as infrastructure has had influence on other architectural works in the west. The Erie Canal in North America is designed and draws inspiration from the Chinese architecture. Many saw the canal as an economic advantage that could bring economic prosperity, like the canal and its benefits. Matteo Ricci's Journals describes the canal in great detail documenting the economic prosperity. The pound lock is one of the more notable features of the Erie canal that is directly connected to the infrastructure of the Grand Canal as it is used in other similar bodies of water.

Ming dynasty restoration

The Grand Canal was renovated almost in its entirety between 1411 and 1415 during the Ming dynasty (1368–1644). A magistrate of Jining, Shandong sent a memorandum to the throne of the Yongle Emperor protesting the current inefficient means of transporting 4,000,000 dan (428,000,000 liters) of grain a year by means of transferring it along several different rivers and canals in barge types that went from deep to shallow after the Huai River, and then transferred back onto deep barges once the shipment of grain reached the Yellow River. Chinese engineers built a dam to divert the Wen River to the southwest in order to feed 60% of its water north into the Grand Canal, with the remainder going south. They dug four large reservoirs in Shandong to regulate water levels, which allowed them to avoid pumping water from local sources and water tables. Between 1411 and 1415 a total of 165,000 laborers dredged the canal bed in Shandong and built new channels, embankments, and canal locks.

The Yongle Emperor moved the Ming capital from Nanjing to Beijing in 1403. This move deprived Nanjing of its status as chief political center of China. The reopening of the Grand Canal also benefited Suzhou over Nanjing since the former was in a better position on the main artery of the Grand Canal, and so it became Ming China's greatest economic center. The only other viable contender with Suzhou in the Jiangnan region was Hangzhou, but it was located  further down the Grand Canal and away from the main delta. Even the shipwrecked Korean Choe Bu (1454–1504)—while traveling for five months throughout China in 1488—acknowledged that Hangzhou served not as a competitor but as an economic feeder into the greater Suzhou market. Therefore, the Grand Canal served to make or break the economic fortunes of certain cities along its route and served as the economic lifeline of indigenous trade within China.

The scholar Gu Yanwu of the early Qing dynasty (1644–1912) estimated that the previous Ming dynasty had to employ 47,004 full-time laborers recruited by the lijia corvée system in order to maintain the entire canal system. It is known that 121,500 soldiers and officers were needed simply to operate the 11,775 government grain barges in the mid-15th century.

Besides its function as a grain shipment route and major vein of river-borne indigenous trade in China, the Grand Canal had long been a government-operated courier route as well. Each courier station was assigned a different name, all of which were popularized in travel songs of the period.

Qing dynasty and modern China

The Manchus invaded China in the mid-17th century, allowed through the northern passes by the Chinese general Wu Sangui once the Ming capital at Beijing had fallen into the hands of a rebel army. The Manchus established the Qing dynasty (1644–1912), and under their leadership, the Grand Canal was overseen and maintained just as in earlier times.

In 1855, the Yellow River flooded and changed its course, severing the course of the canal in Shandong. This was foreseen by a Chinese official in 1447, who remarked that the flood-prone Yellow River made the Grand Canal like a throat that could be easily strangled (leading some officials to request restarting the grain shipments through the East China Sea). In 1855 the dikes of the canal were opened to flood advancing troops of the Taiping Rebellion's Northern Expedition. Because of various factors—the difficulty of crossing the Yellow River, the increased development of an alternative sea route for grain-ships, and the opening of the Tianjin-Pukou Railway and the Beijing-Hankou Railway—the canal languished and for decades the northern and southern parts remained separate. Many of the canal sections fell into disrepair, and some parts were returned to flat fields. Even today, the Grand Canal has not fully recovered from this disaster. After the founding of the People's Republic of China in 1949, the need for economic development led the authorities to order heavy reconstruction work.

The Grand Canal played a major role during the Great Leap Forward as it provided an efficient way to transport grains.

By the 1990s, pollution in the canal had reached the point where boat and barge crews could tell when they were nearing Hangzhou by the stench of the visibly black water. A $250 million restoration project begun in 2001 has improved water quality to the point where it no longer smells and is once again capable of supporting some fauna.

The economic importance of the canal likely will continue. The governments of the Shandong, Jiangsu, and Zhejiang Provinces planned dredging meant to increase shipping capacity by 40 percent by 2012.

On June 22, 2014, The Grand Canal was listed as a World Heritage Site, at the 2014 Conference on World Heritage.

Historical sections

As well as its present-day course, fourteen centuries of canal-building have left the Grand Canal with a number of historical sections. Some of these have disappeared, others are still partially extant, and others form the basis for the modern canal. The following are the most important but do not form an exhaustive list.

Jia Canal
In 12 BCE, in order to solve the problem of the Grand Canal having to use  of the perilous course of the Yellow River in Northern Jiangsu, a man named Li Hualong created the Jia Canal. Named after the Jia River whose course it followed, it ran  from Xiazhen (modern Weishan) on the shore of Shandong's Weishan Lake to Suqian in Jiangsu. The construction of the Jia Canal left only  of Yellow River navigation on the Grand Canal, from Suqian to Huai'an, which by 1688 had been removed by the construction of the Middle Canal by Jin Fu.

Nanyang New Canal
In 1566, to escape the problems caused by flooding of the Yellow River around Yutai (now on the western shore of Weishan Lake), the Nanyang New Canal was opened. This change in effect moved the Grand Canal from the low-lying and flood-prone land west of Weishan Lake onto the marginally higher land to its east. It was fed by rivers flowing from east to west from the borders of the Shandong massif.

Huitong Canal
North of the Jizhou Canal summit section, the Huitong Canal ran downhill, fed principally by the River Wen, to join the Wei River in the city of Linqing. In 1289, a geological survey preceded its one-year construction. The Huitong Canal, built by an engineer called Ma Zhizhen, ran across sharply sloping ground and the high concentration of locks gave it the nicknames chahe or zhahe, i.e. 'the river of locks'. Its great number of feeder springs (between two and four hundred, depending on the counting method and season of the year) also led to it being called the quanhe or 'river of springs'.

Jizhou Canal
This, the Grand Canal's first true summit section, was engineered by the Mongol Oqruqči in 1238 to connect Jining to the southern end of the Huitong Canal. It rose to a height of 42 meters (138 ft) above the Yangtze, but environmental and technical factors left it with chronic water shortages until it was re-engineered in 1411 by Song Li of the Ming. Song Li's improvements, recommended by a local man named Bai Ying, included damming the rivers Wen and Guang and drawing lateral canals from them to feed reservoir lakes at the very summit, at a small town called Nanwang.

Duke Huan's Conduit
In 369 CE, General Huan Wen of the Eastern Jin dynasty connected the shallow river valleys of the Huai and the Yellow. He achieved this by joining two of these rivers' tributaries, the Si and the Ji respectively, at their closest point, across a low watershed of the Shandong massif. Huan Wen's primitive summit canal became a model for the engineers of the Jizhou Canal.

Yilou Canal
The Shanyang Canal originally opened onto the Yangtze a short distance south of Yangzhou. As the north shore of the Yangtze gradually silted up to create the sandbank island of Guazhou, it became necessary for boats crossing to and from the Jiangnan Canal to sail the long way around the eastern edge of that island. After a particularly rough crossing of the Yangtze from Zhenjiang, the local prefect realized that a canal dug directly across Guazhou would reduce the journey time and thus make the crossing safer. The Yilou Canal was opened in 738 CE and still exists, though not as part of the modern Grand Canal route.

Modern course
 

Its course is today divided into seven sections. From south to north these are the Jiangnan Canal, the Li Canal, the Inner Canal, the Middle Canal, the Lu Canal, the South Canal, the North Canal, and the Tonghui River.

Man-Made Lake Lianhu

Training Lake “Lianhu” was used to feed water to the Grand Canal section near Jiangnan. Since the canal was man-made there was not enough naturally flowing water to keep the canal at proper depth so that boats could travel through it. So a man-made lake was used to feed water to the Jiangnan section of the Grand Canal. It was protected by the Government from reclamation and any use of the lake water without proper taxation was deemed illegal. It was supposed to be protected from profitable exploitation, but because the government changed over the years, lake Lianhu had been reclaimed many times and it started to become more shallow. The government changed the lake to become more profitable farmland which led to reclamations and agricultural irrigation using the lake. This began to lead to Lake Lianhu not being able to properly feed water to the Grand Canal. Loss of depth due to reclamation and maintenance costs became too high for the lake to become practical to use. Even though it was a man made lake it was still a beautiful sight. Many different people praised its beauty and various poems have been written about the lake. In recent years recreational uses for the lake have become more popular and may lead to the lake being restored.

Jiangnan Canal

This southernmost section of the canal runs from Hangzhou in Zhejiang, where the canal connects with the Qiantang River, to Zhenjiang in Jiangsu, where it meets the Yangtze. After leaving Hangzhou heading north toward Beijing, the canal passes around the eastern border of Lake Tai, through the major cities of Jiaxing, Suzhou, Wuxi, and Changzhou before reaching Zhenjiang. 

The Jiangnan (or ‘South of the Yangtze’) Canal is heavily utilized by barge traffic bringing coal, containers and construction materials to the booming delta. It is generally a minimum of 100 meters wide in the congested city centers, and often two or three times this width in the neighboring countryside. In recent years, broad bypass canals have been dug around the major cities to reduce ‘traffic jams’.

The Suzhou section of the Jiangnan Canal flows through the western part of the city. It includes ten city gates and over 20 stone bridges of traditional design and historic areas that have been well preserved as well as temples and pavilions.

Inner Canal
The Inner Canal runs between the Yangtze and Huai rivers, skirting the Shaobo, Gaoyou, and Hongze lakes of central Jiangsu. This section connects the cities of Huai'an and Yangzhou. Here the land lying to the west of the canal is higher than its bed while the land to the east is lower. Traditionally the Shanghe region west of the canal has been prone to frequent flooding, while the Xiahe region to its east has been hit by less frequent but immensely damaging inundations caused by the failure of the Grand Canal levees. Recent works have allowed floodwaters from Shanghe to be diverted safely out to sea.  Like the Jiangnan Canal, the Inner Canal is heavily utilized by barge traffic bringing coal, construction materials and increasingly shipping containers around Jiangsu Province.

Middle Canal

This ‘Middle Canal’ section runs from Huai'an to Weishan Lake, passing through Luoma Lake and following more than one course, the result of the impact of centuries of Yellow River flooding. After Pizhou, a northerly course passes through Tai'erzhuang to enter Weishan Lake at Hanzhuang bound for Nanyang and Jining (this course is the remnant of the New Nanyang Canal of 1566 – see below). A southerly course passes close by Xuzhou and enters Weishan Lake near Peixian. This latter course is less used today. Canal is utilized by barge traffic bringing coal and construction materials around northern Jiangsu Province.

Lu Canal
At Weishan Lake, both courses enter Shandong province. From here to Linqing, the canal is called the Lu or ‘Shandong’ Canal. It crosses a series of lakes—Zhaoyang, Dushan, and Nanyang—which nominally form a continuous body of water. At present, diversions of water mean that the lakes are often largely dry land. North of the northernmost Nanyang Lake is the city of Jining. In the 1950s a new canal was dug to the south of the old summit section. The old summit section is now dry, while the new canal holds too little water to be navigable. About  further north, passing close by Dongping Lake, the canal reaches the Yellow River. By this point waterless, it no longer connects to the river. It reappears again in Liaocheng City on the north bank where, intermittently flowing through a renovated stone channel, it reaches the city of Linqing on the Shandong – Hebei border. Liangshan County is the northern terminus of the canal for barge traffic.

Southern Canal

Though one of the northernmost sections, its name derives from its position relative to Tianjin. The Wei River at this point is heavily polluted while drought and industrial water extraction have left it too low to be navigable. The canal, now in Hebei province, passes through the cities of Dezhou and Cangzhou. Although to spectators, the canal appears to be a deep waterway in these city centers, its depth is maintained by weirs and the canal is all but dry where it passes through the surrounding countryside. At its terminus, the canal joins the Hai River in the center of Tianjin City before turning north-west.

Northern Canal and Tonghui River
In Tianjin, the canal heads northwest, for a short time following the course of the Yongding, a tributary of the Hai River, before branching off toward Tongzhou on the edge of the municipality of Beijing. It is here that the modern canal stops and that a Grand Canal Cultural Park has been built. During the Yuan dynasty, a further canal on the Tonghui River connected Tongzhou with a wharf called the Houhai or "rear sea" in central Beijing. In the Ming and Qing dynasties, however, the water level in the Tonghui River dropped and ships could not travel from Tongzhou to Beijing. Tongzhou then became the northern shipping terminus of the canal. Cargo was unloaded at Tongzhou and transported to Beijing by land. The Tonghui river still exists as a wide, concrete-lined storm-channel and drain for the suburbs of Beijing.

Eastern Zhejiang Canal
The Eastern Zhejiang Canal, also known as the Hangzhou–Ningbo Canal is located in Zhejiang. Its west end is in Xixing Street, Binjiang District, Hangzhou City, crossing Cao'e River and Shaoxing City to its east end, the Yong River estuary in Ningbo City. The canal is 239 kilometers (149 mi) long. Early canal construction took place in the Shanyin old canal in Shaoxing City, in the Spring and Autumn period (approximately 771 to 476 BC). In the third century AD, an official named He Xun supervised the construction of the Xixing Canal, establishing the complete Eastern Zhejiang Canal.

In the Southern Song dynasty (1127–1279), the capital was established at Linan, which meant that the Eastern Zhejiang Canal became an important shipping channel. From the Yuan Dynasty (1271–1368) to the Qing Dynasty (1644–1912), the Eastern Zhejiang Canal lost its privilege but remained navigable. In recent years, because of newer modes of transportation, the canal has been gradually replaced. The reconstruction of the canal began in 2002, by 2007 it was partially navigable, and the renovation project finished in 2009, though the Ningbo section was not navigable until the end of 2013.

In May 2013, the Eastern Zhejiang Canal was listed in the seventh group of Major Historical and Cultural Site Protected at the National Level and was included in the Grand Canal. In November 2008, as an extension of the Beijing-Hangzhou Grand Canal and the passage between the Grand Canal and the Maritime Silk Road, the Eastern Zhejiang Canal was placed into the nomination file in the UNESCO World Heritage program. In 2014, with Beijing-Hangzhou Grand Canal and Sui & Tang Grand Canal, the Eastern Zhejiang Canal became one World Heritage site.

Elevations
Though the canal nominally crosses the watersheds of five river systems, in reality, the variation between these is so low that it has only a single summit section. The elevation of the canal bed varies from 1 m below sea level at Hangzhou to 38.5 m above at its summit. At Beijing, it reaches 27 m, fed by streams flowing downhill from the mountains to the west. The water flows from Beijing toward Tianjin, from Nanwang north toward Tianjin, and from Nanwang south toward Yangzhou. The water level in the Jiangnan Canal remains scarcely above sea level (the Zhenjiang ridge is 12 meters higher than that of the Yangtze River).

Uses

Transportation 

From the Tang to Qing dynasties, the Grand Canal served as the main artery between northern and southern China and was essential for the transport of grain to Beijing. Although it was mainly used for shipping grain, it also transported other commodities and the corridor along the canal developed into an important economic belt. Records show that, at its height, every year more than 8,000 boats transported four to six million dan (240,000–360,000 metric tons) of grain. The convenience of transport also enabled rulers to lead inspection tours to southern China. In the Qing dynasty, the Kangxi and Qianlong emperors made twelve trips to the south, on all occasions but one reaching Hangzhou.

The Grand Canal also enabled cultural exchange and political integration to occur between the north and south of China. The canal even made a distinct impression on some of China's early European visitors. Marco Polo recounted the Grand Canal's arched bridges as well as the warehouses and prosperous trade of its cities in the 13th century. The famous Roman Catholic missionary Matteo Ricci traveled from Nanjing to Beijing along the canal at the end of the 16th century.

Since the founding of the People's Republic of China in 1949, the canal has been used primarily to transport vast amounts of bulk goods such as bricks, gravel, sand, diesel, and coal. The Jianbi ship locks on the Yangtze are currently handling some 75,000,000 tons each year, and the Li Canal is forecast to reach 100,000,000 tons in the next few years. When first constructed, the canal served as a major source of transportation, linking northern and southern China. With the introduction of expressways, railways and high speed railways in modern China, passenger travel on the canal became far less common.

Currently, ships can only travel up to Jining. The section from Jining to Beijing is not available for transport due to the silt deposit buildup from the Yellow River and lack of water sources. There are plans for restoring transportation up to Tai'an.

South-North Water Transfer Project

The Grand Canal is currently being upgraded to serve as the Eastern Route of the South-North Water Transfer Project. Additional amounts of water from the Yangtze will be drawn into the canal in Jiangdu City, where a giant  pumping station was already built in the 1980s, and is then fed uphill by pumping stations along the route and through a tunnel under the Yellow River, from where it can flow downhill to reservoirs near Tianjin. Construction on the Eastern Route officially began on December 27, 2002, and water was supposed to reach Tianjin by 2012. However, water pollution has affected the viability of this project.

Notable travelers
In 1169, with China divided between the Jurchen-led Jin dynasty in the north and the Southern Song dynasty in the south, the Southern Song Emperor Xiaozong sent a delegation to the Jurchen to wish their ruler well for the New Year. A scholar-official named Lou Yue, secretary to the delegation, recorded the journey, much of which was made upon the Grand Canal, and submitted his Diary of a Journey to the North to the emperor on his return.

In 1170, the poet, politician, and historian Lu You traveled along the Grand Canal from Shaoxing to the river Yangtze, recording his progress in a diary.

In the late 1200s, Marco Polo traveled extensively through China and his trips included time on the Grand Canal, then a major artery for shipping silk, porcelain, and wine.

In 1345, Arab traveler Ibn Battuta traveled China and journeyed through the Abe Hayat river (Grand Canal) up to the capital Khanbalik (Beijing).

In 1488, the shipwrecked Korean scholar Choe Bu traveled the entire length of the Grand Canal on his way from Zhejiang to Beijing (and on to Korea) and left a detailed account of his trip.

In 1600, Matteo Ricci traveled to Beijing from Nanjing via the Grand Canal waterway to gain the support of the Wanli Emperor of the Ming dynasty with the help of Wang Zhongde, the Director of the Board of Rites in the central government of China at the time.

In 1793, after a largely fruitless diplomatic mission to Jehol, a large part of Lord Macartney's embassy returned south to the Yangtze delta via the Grand Canal.

In 1848, Robert Fortune reached Hang Chow Foo by the Grand Canal in his quest for tea plants.

See also

 History of canals in China
 Lingqu Canal
 Turpan water system
 Dujiangyan irrigation system
 Economy of China
 Economic history of China (1912–49)
 Economic history of China before 1912
 Economic history of China
 Hydraulic engineering
 History of Beijing

References

Citations

Sources 

 
 Benn, Charles. (2002). China's Golden Age: Everyday Life in the Tang Dynasty. Oxford University Press. .
 Bishop, Kevin (1997). China's Imperial Way.  Hong Kong:  Odyssey.
 Bowman, John S. (2000). Columbia Chronologies of Asian History and Culture. New York: Columbia University Press.
 Brook, Timothy. (1998). The Confusions of Pleasure: Commerce and Culture in Ming China. Berkeley: University of California Press. 
 Carles, W.R. (1900). The Grand Canal of China.  Shanghai: Journal of the North China Branch RAS, Vol. 31, pp. 102–115, 1896-1897 volume, but actually published in 1900.
 Ebrey, Patricia Buckley (1999). The Cambridge Illustrated History of China. Cambridge: Cambridge University Press.  (paperback).
 Fairbank, John King and Merle Goldman (1992). China: A New History; Second Enlarged Edition (2006). Cambridge: MA; London: The Belknap Press of Harvard University Press. 
 Gandar, Dominique (1903). Le Canal Imperial:  Etude Historique et Descriptive.  Shanghai:  Imprimerie de la Mission Catholique. Variétés Sinologiques No. 4.
 Garnett, J.W. (1907).  Report by Mr. J.W. Garnett of a Journey through the Provinces of Shantung and Kiangsu. British Parliamentary Papers, China No.1, CD3500.  London:  HMSO.
 Hinton, Harold C. (1956). The Grain Tribute System of China (1845-1911). Cambridge:  Harvard University Press.
 Liao Pin, ed. (1987). The Grand Canal:  An Odyssey. Beijing:  Foreign Languages Press.
 Martin, W.A.P. (1897). A Cycle of Cathay.
 Needham, Joseph. (1986). Science and Civilization in China: Volume 4, Physics and Physical Technology, Part 3, Civil Engineering and Nautics. Taipei: Caves Books, Ltd. 
 New China News Ltd. (1984). The Grand Canal of China.  Hong Kong: South China Morning Post Ltd.
 Staunton, George (1797). An Authentic Account of an Embassy ...to the Emperor of China.
 China’s Ancient Lifeline  published May 2013 National Geographic magazine
 ; China's Canal, Jing Fang and Du Jiaju eds, Jinling Book Society, 1997.

External links

 The Reinvigoration of the Grand Canal
 Hangzhou Section of The Grand Canal – EN.GOTOHZ.COM

Canals in China
Sui dynasty
Naval history of China
Economic history of China
Ship canals
Water transport in China
World Heritage Sites in China